Kasuya (written: 粕谷 or 糟屋) is a Japanese surname. Notable people with the surname include:

Isamu Kasuya, Japanese motorcycle racer
 (born 1975), Japanese swimmer
Shunji Kasuya (born 1962), Japanese racing driver
 (1562–1607), Japanese samurai

Japanese-language surnames